The 1303 Crete earthquake occurred at about dawn on 8 August. It had an estimated magnitude of about 8, a maximum intensity of IX (Violent) on the Mercalli intensity scale, and triggered a major tsunami that caused severe damage and loss of life on Crete and at Alexandria. It badly damaged the Lighthouse of Alexandria.

Tectonic setting
The Hellenic arc, the most likely location for this earthquake, is an arcuate tectonic feature related to the subduction of the African Plate beneath the Aegean Sea Plate. It is one of the most active seismic zones in western Eurasia and has a history of large earthquakes that also affect Egypt.

Damage
The earthquake and the tsunami are recorded as having a devastating impact on Heraklion, Crete. Detailed information is available from reports made by representatives from Heraklion (then Candia) to the controlling Venetian administration, written on the day of the earthquake and twenty days later. They describe the extent of damage to the main public buildings of Candia and castles over the whole island.

The reports mention that most of the victims were women and children, without giving numbers. There was massive flooding at Alexandria. The port city of Acre, on the Levantine coast, was also affected. Buildings were destroyed and people swept to their deaths.

In Egypt the earthquake caused severe damage in Cairo, dislodging much of the Great Pyramid's white limestone casing and toppling minarets on many mosques. In Alexandria the city walls were mostly destroyed. Most notably, the Lighthouse of Alexandria, one of the seven wonders of the world, was badly damaged.

Characteristics

Earthquake
Although the precise location of the epicenter is uncertain, it is generally agreed that the earthquake ruptured the eastern segment of the Hellenic arc somewhere between Crete and Rhodes. The earthquake caused damage over a wide area including Crete, the Peloponnese, Rhodes, Cairo, Acre, Damascus, Antioch, and Cyprus and was felt as far away as Constantinople and possibly Tunis. The exact magnitude is unknown but is estimated to have been about 8.0.

Tsunami
Modelling of the tsunami predicts a maximum 9 m run-up at Alexandria, with about a 40-minute delay from the time of the earthquake to the arrival of the first wave in Egypt.

See also
 365 Crete earthquake
 List of earthquakes in Greece
 List of historical earthquakes
 List of historical tsunamis

References

14th-century earthquakes
Crete Earthquake, 1303
Earthquakes in Crete
Kingdom of Candia
Megathrust earthquakes in Greece
Tsunamis in Egypt
Tsunamis in Greece
Lighthouse of Alexandria
Great Pyramid of Giza